Paul Faivre (3 March 1886 – 5 March 1973) was a French actor.

Selected filmography

 The House Opposite (1937)
 Behind the Facade (1939)
 Vidocq (1939)
 Annette and the Blonde Woman (1942)
 The Count of Monte Cristo (1943)
 Domino (1943)
 Sowing the Wind (1944)
 Boule de suif (1945)
 My First Love (1945)
 The Black Cavalier (1945)
 Jericho (1946)
 Not So Stupid (1946)
 The Captain (1946)
 Gringalet (1946)
 The Misfortunes of Sophie (1946)
 Cyrano de Bergerac (1946)
 Fantômas (1946)
 Love Around the House (1947)
 Rendezvous in Paris (1947)
 The Last Vacation (1948)
 Under the Cards (1948)
 The Heart on the Sleeve (1948)
 Thirst of Men (1950)
 Quay of Grenelle (1950)
 Mademoiselle Josette, My Woman (1950)
 The Beautiful Image (1951)
 My Husband Is Marvelous (1952)
 The House on the Dune (1952)
 It Happened in Paris (1952)
 She and Me (1952)
 Monsieur Leguignon, Signalman (1952)
 Imperial Violets (1952)
 Run Away Mr. Perle (1952)
 The House on the Dune (1952)
 Capitaine Pantoufle (1953)
 The Last Robin Hood (1953)
 Wonderful Mentality (1953)
 Poisson d'avril (1954)
 Leguignon the Healer (1954)
 Stain in the Snow (1954)
 Thirteen at the Table (1955)
 Eighteen Hour Stopover (1955)
 Blood to the Head (1956)
 The Seventh Commandment (1957)
 The Singer from Mexico (1957)
 The Gentleman from Epsom (1962)
 Monsieur (1964)

External links

1886 births
1973 deaths
French male film actors
People from Belfort
20th-century French male actors